The tornado outbreak sequence of May 1896 was a series of violent and deadly tornado outbreaks that struck much of the Central and Southern United States from May 15 to 28, 1896. It is considered one of the worst tornado outbreak sequences on record with tornado expert Tom Grazulis stating that the week of May 24–28 was "perhaps the most violent single week of tornado activity in United States history". There were four particularly notable tornado outbreaks during the two-week period. It produced three F5 tornadoes as well as the third deadliest tornado ever in United States history. A total of 484 people were killed during the entire outbreak sequence by at least 38 different tornadoes which struck Texas, Oklahoma, Kansas, Nebraska, Kentucky, Iowa, Illinois, Michigan, Missouri, Pennsylvania, New Jersey and Maryland.

Confirmed tornadoes
The ratings for these tornadoes were done by tornado expert Thomas P. Grazulis and are not official ratings.

May 15 event

May 17 event

May 18 event

May 19 event

May 20 event

May 24 event

May 25 event

May 27 event

May 28 event

Sherman, Texas

On the first day of the outbreak sequence, most of the fatalities came from a single supercell thunderstorm that traveled from Denton to Sherman. The tornado began in the Pilot Point area, where farm homes were shifted off of their foundations. The tornado widened and strengthened into a very violent F5 and swept away numerous farms west of Farmington and Howe. An iron-beam bridge was torn from its supports and twisted into pieces, and one of the beams was driven several feet into the ground. Headstones at a cemetery were shattered, and a 500-pound stone was carried for 250 yards. Trees in the area were completely debarked with some reduced to stumps, and grass was scoured from lawns in town. At least 200 people were injured, and bodies of the victims were transported into the courthouse and a vacant building. Several bodies were recovered from a muddy creek. 73 people were killed by this single tornado, one of the worst on record in North Texas and the Red River Valley region.

Additional killer tornadoes were recorded north of Wichita, Kansas in McPherson County and further south in Bryan County, Oklahoma.

Seneca–Oneida, Kansas/Falls City, Nebraska

In Seneca, the tornado destroyed the courthouse and a new schoolhouse, and the opera house was completely leveled and swept away. Damage in Seneca alone was estimated at around $250,000 (in 1896 Dollars) where most of the homes, the fairgrounds and other small structures sustained at least heavy, if not complete, damage. The damage path was two miles wide at Reserve, and only three buildings were left undamaged at that location. The tornado damaged 50 homes and destroyed 20 others on the north side of Sabetha. Many farms were entirely swept away along the path as well, some of which were reportedly left "as bare as the prairie". The tornado continued into Nebraska, where four people died and damage occurred on the south side of Falls City. At least 200 people were injured.

Ortonville–Thomas–Oakwood, Michigan

The tornado affected portions of Oakland, Lapeer and Livingston Counties northwest of Detroit. Towns affected included Thomas, Ortonville, Oakwood, and Whigville just after 9:00 pm. Homes were leveled or swept away, and fatalities occurred along the path. Trees were completely debarked along the path as well, with even small twigs stripped bare in some cases. Homes were swept away in Thomas, including one that was obliterated with the debris scattered up to 10 miles away. A piano from that residence was found 200 yards away from the foundation, with one end "pounded full of grass". Weather Bureau inspectors reported that grass in the center-most part of the circulation was "pounded down into the earth, as if it had been washed into the earth by a heavy flow of water." At least 100 people were injured. With 47 deaths, this is the second-deadliest tornado ever in Michigan trailing only the Flint Tornado of 1953 which killed 116 in Genesee County just outside Flint. Twenty-two people were killed in Ortonville, ten in Oakwood, three in Thomas, four north of Oxford and three in Whigville with others in rural areas. Nine of the fatalities were in a single home in Ortonville.

Other killer tornadoes on that day touched down in Ogle County, Illinois (two different tornadoes) and Macomb & Tuscola Counties in Michigan. Several homes and farms in the Mount Clemens area were wiped out and others were moved from their foundations. The recently completed Colonial Hotel was leveled. Thirty homes were leveled in total, and two people were killed.

St. Louis, Missouri/East St. Louis, Illinois

The third deadliest tornado in United States history struck St. Louis and its metropolitan area on both sides of the Mississippi River in Missouri and Illinois on May 27. Preceded by a storm that nearly destroyed the city with electrical and water damage, that tornado alone at least killed 255, injuring thousands and destroying 50 million property value.  This tornado in addition killed 27 other people elsewhere in Illinois and seven elsewhere in Missouri including three at a school in Audrain County. Twenty-four of the 27 other fatalities were recorded by a single tornado with 13 of them near New Baden. In that town about half of the homes were completely destroyed with damage figures at around $50,000. The towns of Belleville and Mascoutah were also hit. Three people were killed by the other killer tornado that tracked between Nashville and Mount Vernon. Fatalities were also reported the following day in Pennsylvania and New Jersey near Trenton between Philadelphia and New York City.

See also
 List of North American tornadoes and tornado outbreaks
 St. Louis tornado history

Notes

References

Bibliography

External links
 1896 Killer tornadoes courtesy of the Tornado History Project

1896 natural disasters in the United States
Tornadoes of 1896
Tornadoes in the United States
Tornadoes in Texas
Tornadoes in Oklahoma
Tornadoes in Kansas
Tornadoes in Nebraska
Tornadoes in Kentucky
Tornadoes in Iowa
Tornadoes in Illinois
Tornadoes in Michigan
Tornadoes in Missouri
Tornadoes in Pennsylvania
Tornadoes in New Jersey
Tornadoes in Maryland
F5 tornadoes
Tornado outbreaks
May 1896 events